Canton High School (CHS) is a secondary school in Canton, Massachusetts, United States.

History
First discussed in 1866 among prominent members of the town of Canton, the high school was established in 1869, when, for the first time, four classes were educated in the same building at a grammar school in South Canton.

In 1911 the Hemenway School became Canton's principal high school due to the population increase and a need for a larger building. It became an elementary school in 1950 after high school students transferred to a new building.

Statistics
The student body makeup is 49 percent male and 51 percent female, and the total minority enrollment is 24 percent.

Sports 
Canton High School's athletic teams compete in the Hockomock League.

In November 2019 Canton won the girls volleyball Division II state championship.

Notable staff
Martin J. Badoian, mathematics teacher

Notable alumni
Chuck Hogan, a novelist
Bobby Witt, a former baseball player for the Texas Rangers
Bill Burr, a stand-up comedian, actor, writer, and podcaster
Kevin Rooney, hockey player for the New Jersey Devils

References

External links
Official website

Schools in Norfolk County, Massachusetts
Public high schools in Massachusetts
Buildings and structures in Canton, Massachusetts
Hockomock League